Vlacherna is a settlement in Arcadia, Greece. Administratively it is the seat of the local community (residents 371, 2011 census). It is a municipal unit of Levidi in the municipality of Tripoli (Kallikratis Plan, 2010). It is built at a height of 954 meters above sea level, on the slopes of Mainalo. It is 32 kilometers from Tripoli, 7 km from Levidi and 12 km from Vytina.

Most villagers are farmers. For their sheep and goats and their fieldwork, they need the meadows and fields that are located in the widening plain below their village. But peculiarities of nature—too much or too little water, depending on the annual time—are a burden for them, also, because the plain is a large karst basin without surface drainage.

The photo with the sheep shows the main part of the basin, where attempts are made to avoid flooding by several ditches and subterranean drainage. However, when there is very much winter rain, floods are possible in spite of two ponors (katavothes) and an artificial tunnel. The flooding then forces the farmers to delay their cultivations. The basin has two extensions to the far northeast.

The first basin extension has a large karst spring (Sintzi Spring) right, where the surface of the sedimentary deposits of the basin touch the limestone formation of the mountain. Existence of water even in the dry summer period makes the soil more fertile for more grassland an acres to cultivate.

See also 
Orchomenus (Arcadia)

References

External links 
 Vlacherna, conducted tour 
 "The cleaning of the ditch in Vlacherna (Arkadia) is finished". Blog of February 14, 2014, with photos of ditch , (available in 2019)
 Sintzi spring (Arkadia) with pictures including Kandila

Populated places in Arcadia, Peloponnese
Landforms of Arcadia, Peloponnese
Plains of Greece
Karst fields